Vietnam first sent their athletes to compete in the Southeast Asian Games in the 1989 Southeast Asian Games in Kuala Lumpur, Malaysia. Vietnam has hosted the games only twice in 2003 and 2021.

Vietnam has won 1133 gold medals, 992 silver medals, and 1107 bronze medals totaling to 2,886 medals since 1989. Vietnam has topped the Medal Tally in two Southeast Asian Games in 2003 and 2021 when they hosted it.

Medal Tally 

 In 1959 until 1973, Vietnam has won medals under South Vietnam. These are only the medals they won as a unified Vietnam

Medals of South Vietnam (1959-1973)

References